Phragmatobia lineata, the lined ruby tiger moth, is a moth in the family Erebidae. It was described by Newman and Donahue in 1966. It is found from the north-eastern United States, west to Manitoba and Alberta. The habitat consists of prairies.

The wingspan is about 57 mm. Adults are on wing from early to late May.

The larvae probably feed on various low-growing plants.

References

Moths described in 1966
Spilosomina